Pieter Lastman (1583–1633) was a Dutch painter. Lastman is considered important because of his work as a painter of history pieces and because his pupils included Rembrandt and Jan Lievens. In his paintings Lastman paid careful attention to the faces, hands and feet.

Early life 
Pieter Lastman was born in Amsterdam. He was the fourth child of Pieter Segersz, (1548-1624), a town-beadle who was dismissed in 1578 for being a Catholic. His mother, Barber Jacobsdr, (1549-1624) was an appraiser of paintings and goods.

Education and Italy 
His apprenticeship was with Gerrit Pietersz Sweelinck, the brother of Jan Pieterszoon Sweelinck. Between approximately 1604 and 1607 Lastman was in Italy, where he was influenced by Caravaggio (as were the painters of the Utrecht School a few years later) and by Adam Elsheimer.

Back in Amsterdam 
Back in Amsterdam he moved in with his mother in the Sint Antoniesbreestraat, living next to mayor Geurt van Beuningen. Lastman never married although he promised to marry the sister of Gerbrand Adriaensz Bredero. Because of his health Lastman moved in with his brother in 1632.

Death 
He died the next year after moving in with his brother, and was buried in the Oude Kerk on 4 April 1633.

Students 
Because Rembrandt never visited Italy, it is likely that he was influenced by Caravaggio (see e.g. chiaroscuro) mainly or significantly via Lastman. His pupils besides Rembrandt and Lievens were Bartholomeus Breenbergh, Nicolaes Lastman, Pieter Pieterz Nedek and Jan Albertsz Rotius.

Rembrandt used many of the same themes as Lastman. Among his most famous works his rendition of the Stoning of Saint Stephen, The Baptism of the Eunuch, and Sacrifice of Abraham appear to be very influenced by Lastman. It is even possible that as an apprentice, Rembrandt may have done the preliminary sketches for each of these works by Lastman.

Gallery

References

Additional sources
 Murray, P. & L. (1997). Penguin Dictionary of Art and Artists (7th edition), p. 287, 436–438. London: Penguin Books. .

External links

Artcyclopedia on Pieter Lastman
The Rijksmuseum on Pieter Lastman
Works and literature on Pieter Lastman at PubHist
Works at WGA
Dutch and Flemish paintings from the Hermitage, an exhibition catalog from The Metropolitan Museum of Art (fully available online as PDF), which contains material on Lastman (cat. no. 17)

1583 births
1633 deaths
Dutch Golden Age painters
Dutch male painters
Painters from Amsterdam
Burials at the Oude Kerk, Amsterdam